Divisaderos the municipal seat of Divisaderos Municipality of the Mexican state of Sonora. Access is by paved road to Moctezuma and Tepache. Almost all he inhabitants live in the municipal seat, which lies at an elevation of 850 m. 

The economy is based on subsistence agriculture of corn and beans as well as cattle-raising, especially to export of calves to the United States.

Sources and external links
Divisaderos, Ayuntamiento Digital (Official Website of Divisaderos, Sonora)
MUNICIPIO DE DIVISADEROS 
DIVISADEROS: BASIC INFORMATION (in English)

Populated places in Sonora